Glagolitic is a Unicode block containing the characters invented by Saint Cyril for translating scripture into Slavonic. Glagolitic script is the precursor of Cyrillic.

Block

History
The following Unicode-related documents record the purpose and process of defining specific characters in the Glagolitic block:

References 

Unicode blocks